Programme One was a television channel produced and transmitted by Soviet Central Television, the television broadcasting organization of the USSR. It had a mixed schedule of news and entertainment, with the emphasis on events in the USSR, and also included regional programming.

History
Programme One was established on 22 March 1951 when, as part of a reorganization of the television system, the Moscow Television Station changed its name to reflect its planned expansion. It was known officially as the  CT USSR Programme One (Russian: Первая программа ЦТ СССР).

The channel, which was transmitted on the SECAM D/K standard, carried advertising for the first time in the 1980s.  The channel was broadcast until 1991. In September of that year, it was renamed as Central Television Channel One (Russian: Первый канал ЦТ), and then in December, following the dissolution of the USSR, became Ostankino Television Channel One.

Following the dissolution of the USSR, Programme One's frequencies were transferred to the new state broadcasting organizations in the former Soviet republics, while in the Russian republic the main Ostankino Television channel took over its signal and transmitters.

Programmes
The periodic Little Blue Light became a staple of Soviet Union celebrations during New Year's Eve, International Women's Day, and International Workers' Day. The programme continues to run today on Russia 1.

The news department did not employ news journalists until 1989, when they began to front the shorter bulletins (the main 18:30 and 21:00 news programmes was fronted only by senior journalists until after the failed coup d'etat).

See also
Eastern Bloc information dissemination
CCTV 1 - similar channel in China

Eastern Bloc mass media
Soviet culture
Television in the Soviet Union